St. Mary Huana Ganja is the tenth album by the Slovak punk rock/comedy rock band Horkýže Slíže, released on 4 November 2012, exactly on 20th anniversary of the group's formation.

Track list

Personnel
 Peter Hrivňák (Kuko) – vocals, bass guitar
 Mário Sabo (Sabotér) – guitar, backing vocals
 Juraj Štefánik (Doktor) – guitar, backing vocals
 Marek Viršík (Vandel) – drums, backing vocals

Guests
 Erik Knotek - vocals (track1)
 Sanchez - vocals (track 2)
 Zita Rigondeaux (BijouTerrier) - vocals (track 4)
 Bolek Polívka - vocals (track 5)
 Milo "Whisky" Lábel (Slobodná Európa) - vocals (track 6)
 Tomás Klus - vocals (track 7)
 Branuško Jóbus, Romdžo Mikulčík - vocals (track 8)
 Martin Redface - keyboards (track 9)
 Ladislav Duda - vocals (track 10)
 Jimi Cimbala - guitar solo (track 13)

External links 
Horkýže Slíže official website

2012 albums
Horkýže Slíže albums